Jeffrey Wang may refer to:

Jeffrey Ong (born 1972), Malaysian swimmer
Jeff Wang (born 1976), Taiwanese actor